Bishnah Assembly constituency is one of the 87 constituencies in the Jammu and Kashmir Legislative Assembly of Jammu and Kashmir a north state of India. Bishnah is also part of Jammu Lok Sabha constituency.

Member of Legislative Assembly
 1962: Trilochan Datt, Jammu & Kashmir National Conference
 1967: Bhagat Chhaju Ram, Indian National Congress
 1972: Parma Nand, Indian National Congress
 1977: Parma Nand, Indian National Congress
 1983: Bhagat Chhaju Ram, Indian National Congress
 1987: Parma Nand, Jammu & Kashmir National Conference
 1996: Jagdish Raj Dubey, Janata Dal
 2002: Ashwani Kumar Sharma, Independent
 2008: Ashwani Kumar Sharma, Independent

Election results

2014

See also
 Jammu
 List of constituencies of Jammu and Kashmir Legislative Assembly

References

Assembly constituencies of Jammu and Kashmir
Jammu district